Schuurs is a Dutch surname. Notable people with the surname include:

Demi Schuurs (born 1993), Dutch tennis player
Lambert Schuurs (born 1962), Dutch handball coach and long distance runner
Perr Schuurs (born 1999), Dutch footballer

Dutch-language surnames